The 1991–92 Vancouver Canucks season was the Canucks' 22nd NHL season.

Off-season
In the off-season, the Canucks fourth round draft pick in 1989 was finally validated and the Canucks now officially held the NHL rights to Pavel Bure.  There was still a problem, though.  His release from the Central Red Army still needed to be negotiated and there was no guarantee that he would play for the Canucks in the upcoming season.  Director of Hockey Operations Brian Burke accepted the job as general manager of the Hartford Whalers and took Milwaukee Admirals Head Coach, Rick Ley to coach his team. George McPhee filled the vacant front-office post and Jack McIlhargey became the new coach on the farm.  Ron Wilson became an assistant coach, as did Stan Smyl, who tearfully resigned from active playing.  "The Steamer" retired as the team's all-time leader in games (896), goals (262), assists (411), and points (673).  Pat Quinn elected to retain all three titles (President, General Manager, and Head Coach) instead of hiring a new coach.  Craig Coxe was chosen by the San Jose Sharks in the expansion draft, and Steve Bozek signed with the same club as a free agent.  To fill the void, 13-year veteran and Burnaby-native C Ryan Walter was signed away from Montreal.

Forward Trevor Linden is named sole team captain. Defenceman Doug Lidster (who shared the captaincy last season with Linden) is returned to his previous role of an alternate captain. Newly signed forward Ryan Walter, is named the other alternate captain.

Regular season
The team season opened with a home-and-home series against the expansion San Jose Sharks and the Canucks swept.  Pavel Bure, staying in California with his father and brother, watched the game at the Cow Palace from the press box. They managed to roll up a 7–1–1 record, the last being a 3–1 victory over the Washington Capitals on October 24 which leap-frogged the Canucks past Washington into first place in the NHL standings. On November 3, the Canucks paid tribute to their long-time captain and all-time leading scorer turned assistant coach (Smyl) with a special pre-game ceremony. He was presented with a Harley Davidson motorcycle, among other gifts, and had his number 12 raised to the rafters at Pacific Coliseum. In the game to follow, Igor Larionov broke out of a long drought by scoring his first three goals of the season in a 7–2 rout of Edmonton. The Pavel Bure debacle was being settled during that time and two nights later he made his NHL debut before a packed Coliseum against the Winnipeg Jets.  The "Russian Rocket", as he became known, dazzled the crowd with three spectacular rushes but failed to score in a 3–3 tie. Three games later, Bure scored his first two NHL goals in an 8–2 romp of the Los Angeles Kings. Playing with Larionov and Greg Adams, Bure completed the "BIG Line", which became, arguably, the most dangerous offensive unit in Canucks history. Though all of the experts were predicting otherwise, the Canucks remained among the NHL's elite throughout the season, hitting a high point with an 11–0 shellacking of the Calgary Flames on March 1. Bure rolled to 34 goals, many of the highlight-reel variety, breaking Ivan Hlinka's club rookie record in only 65 games. His 60 points equaled Hlinka's total from 1981 to 1982.  Trevor Linden's 75 points led the team in scoring for the second straight year, Cliff Ronning was second with 71 points and Larionov finished third with 65. Kirk McLean rebounded to have a terrific season in goal, winning a club-record 38 games and recording a 2.74 goals-against average with five shutouts earning him team MVP honors. Gino Odjick broke Dave Williams' 11-year-old single-season penalty minutes record with 348 and, what's more, he did it in only 65 games. Overall, the team racked up club record totals of 42 wins and 96 points and won the Smythe Division by 12 points over Los Angeles. The only threat to their division crown was a 10-day strike in early April that threatened to wipe out the playoffs. Finally, the streak of losing seasons had been halted at 16 years and, for the first time since 1982, the Canucks would open up a playoff series at home.

Playoffs
The Canucks would eventually win the first round against the Winnipeg Jets, in seven games, after trailing the series 3–1 for the first playoff series victory since reaching the Stanley Cup Final in 1982.  However, the Canucks would not get past the Edmonton Oilers and lost the series in six games.

Awards
If it was any consolation, the Canucks were pretty successful in post-season hardware.  They didn't win the Stanley Cup, but Pavel Bure won the Calder Memorial Trophy as Rookie of the year, Pat Quinn won the Jack Adams Award as Coach of the Year, and Ryan Walter won the Bud Light NHL Man of the Year for his work in the community.  As well, Kirk McLean is runner-up for the Vezina Trophy (top goaltender) and is named to the NHL's Second All-Star Team.

Regular season

Schedule and results

October

Monthly Record: 9–3–1 (Home 5–1–1; Road 4–2–0)

November

Monthly Record: 7–4–2 (Home 6–2–1; Road 1–2–1)

December

Monthly Record: 6–4–3 (Home 3–1–2; Road 3–3–1)

January

Monthly Record: 7–3–1 (Home 2–2–0; Road 5–1–1)

February

Monthly Record: 5–6–2 (Home 3–2–1; Road 2–4–1)

March

Monthly Record: 7–5–2 (Home 3–1–1; Road 4–4–1)

April

Monthly Record: 1–1–1 (Home 1–0–1; Road 1–0–0) 

Green background indicates win.
Red background indicates regulation loss.
White background indicates tie.

Playoffs

Smythe Division Semi-finals: vs. (4) Winnipeg Jets
Vancouver wins series 4–3

Smythe Division Final: vs. (3) Edmonton Oilers
Edmonton wins series 4–2

Player statistics

Scoring leaders

Note: GP = Games played; G = Goals; A = Assists; Pts = Points; +/- = Plus/minus; PIM = Penalty minutes

Goaltending

Note: GP = Games played; TOI = Time on ice (minutes); W = Wins; L = Losses; T = Ties; GA = Goals against; SO = Shutouts; Sv% = Save percentage; GAA = Goals against average

Playoffs

Scoring leaders

Note: GP = Games played; G = Goals; A = Assists; Pts = Points; +/- = Plus/minus; PIM = Penalty minutes

Goaltending

Note: GP = Games played; TOI = Time on ice (minutes); W = Wins; L = Losses; GA = Goals against; SO = Shutouts; Sv% = Save percentage; GAA = Goals against average

Awards and records

1992 Canuck Awards Winners
Molson Cup - Pavel Bure
President's Trophy - Kirk McLean
Ram Tough Award - Gerald Diduck
Cyclone Taylor Trophy - Kirk McLean
Cyrus H. McLean Trophy - Trevor Linden
Babe Pratt Trophy - Jyrki Lumme
Fred J. Hume Award - Garry Valk
Most Exciting Player - Pavel Bure

Kirk McLean
 Named NHL Player-of-the-Month for October after posting a 9–2–1 record and a 2.37 GAA.  He became the first Canuck to achieve the honor on November 1, 1991.
 Records his 20th victory in a 3–2 win at San Jose on December 22, 1991.  Becoming the fastest Canuck goaltender to reach the 20-win mark.
 Selected to represent the Campbell Conference at the 43rd NHL All-Star Game in Philadelphia on January 18, 1992.
 Played in his 250th career NHL game on March 8, 1992, at Philadelphia and recorded his 33rd win of the season to set a single season franchise record for most wins.
 Recorded 100th career NHL win on March 14, 1992, at Calgary.
 Tied for NHL lead with most wins in the 1991–92 NHL season with 38.
 Tied for the NHL lead for most shutouts in the 1991–92 NHL season with 5.
 Named on the NHL Second All-Star Team on June 16, 1992.
 Named on the Sporting News All-Star Second Team on June 16, 1992.
 Nominated for the Vezina Trophy, but lost to Patrick Roy on June 16, 1992.

Pavel Bure
 Scored his first two NHL goals in an 8–2 victory vs. Los Angeles on November 12, 1991.
 Scored 34 goals to break Ivan Hlinka's franchise rookie goal-scoring record from the 1981–82 season.
 Tied with Ivan Hlinka for the franchise rookie points record with 60.
 Named NHL Rookie-of-the-Month for March/April on April 18, 1992.
 Won the Calder Memorial Trophy as Rookie of the Year on June 16, 1992.

Geoff Courtnall
 Recorded his 200th career NHL assist on November 1, 1991, vs. St. Louis.
 Recorded his 400th career NHL point on November 3, 1991, vs. Edmonton.
 Scored his 200th career NHL goal on November 5, 1991, vs. Winnipeg.
 Had a 9-game point streak scoring 7 goals and recorded 7 assists for 14 points from October 27-November 16.
 Scored 2 goals and recorded 3 assists for 5 points on December 22, 1991, at Quebec.
 Set a club record with 281 shots on goal.

Trevor Linden
 Recorded his 200th career NHL and Canuck point on November 5 vs. Winnipeg.
 Selected to represent the Campbell Conference at the 43rd NHL All-Star Game in Philadelphia on January 18, 1992.  Linden recorded a goal and an assist at the game.
 Played in his 300th career NHL and Canuck game on March 7, 1992, at Hartford.
 Led the team in scoring for the second-straight season.
 Had an 8-game point streak scoring 2 goals and recorded 11 assists for 13 points.

Cliff Ronning
 Played 200th career NHL game on October 21, 1991, vs. Toronto.
 Had a 9-game point streak scoring 5 goals and recorded 8 assists for 13 points from October 17-November 5.
 Recorded his 100th career NHL assist on December 7, 1991, at Toronto.
 Recorded his 200th career NHL point on March 8, 1992, at Philadelphia.
 Molson Cup Player of the Month for October and December.

Pat Quinn
 Sets club record with 42 wins in a single-season.
 Sets club record with 96 points in a single-season.
 Won the Jack Adams Award for Coach of the Year on June 16, 1992.
 Received Coach of the Year honors by the Sporting News on June 16, 1992.

Petr Nedved
 Scored first multiple goal game on January 7, 1992, vs. San Jose.
 Played in his 100th career NHL and Canuck game on January 7, 1992, vs. San Jose.
 Had 6 multiple point games.

Jyrki Lumme
 Scored career high 4 points (1–3–4) vs. Minnesota on December 12, 1991.
 Three game goal streak and 3 game point streak (3–4–7) from December  7–12.
 Played in his 200th career NHL game on December 31, 1991, vs. Los Angeles.

Greg Adams
 Played in his 500th career NHL game on February 13, 1992, at New Jersey.
 Recorded his 400th career NHL point on March 14, 1992, at Calgary.

Igor Larionov
 Played in his 200th career NHL and Canuck game.
 Recorded his 100th career NHL and Canuck point.

Dave Babych
 Scored his 1st career hat-trick including the game winner on November 22, 1991, vs. Calgary.
 Played in his 800th career NHL game on March 5, 1992, at Boston.

Gerald Diduck
 Played his 400th career NHL game on November 21, 1991, at Calgary.
 Recorded his 100th career NHL assist on February 28, 1992, vs. Winnipeg.

Gino Odjick]
 Broke Dave "Tiger" Williams single-season penalty minutes record with 348 doing it in only 65 games on March 2, 1992, vs. St. Louis.
 Played in his 100th career NHL game on March 14, 1992, at Calgary.

Others
 Ryan Walter won the Bud Light NHL Man of the Year for his work in the community on May 27, 1992.
 Sergio Momesso had a 5-game point streak scoring 2 goals and recorded 3 assists for 5 points.
 Dana Murzyn played his 400th career NHL game on October 19, 1991, vs Calgary.

Transactions

Trades

Free agents acquired

Free agents lost

Expansion draft
Vancouver's losses at the 1991 NHL Dispersal and Expansion Drafts in Buffalo, New York.

Draft picks
Vancouver's picks at the 1991 NHL Entry Draft in Buffalo, New York.

Farm teams

Milwaukee Admirals
Vancouver Canucks IHL affiliate that play in Milwaukee, Wisconsin and their home arena is the Bradley Center.

Columbus Chill
Vancouver Canucks ECHL affiliate that play in Columbus, Ohio and their home arena is the Ohio State Fairgrounds Coliseum.

External links
Official website of the Vancouver Canucks

See also
1991–92 NHL Season

References

Vancouver Canucks seasons
Vancouver C
Vancouver
Smythe Division champion seasons